Ian Nigel Chandler (born 9 November 1965) is a British retired Anglican priest. He was the most recent Archdeacon of Plymouth.

Chandler was educated at King's College London and ordained in 1993. After a curacy at All Saints' Hove he was domestic chaplain to Eric Kemp, the Bishop of Chichester, from 1996 to 2000 when he became Vicar of St Richard's Haywards Heath, a position he held until his archdeacon’s appointment. He retired effective 31 December 2018.

References

1965 births
Alumni of King's College London
Archdeacons of Plymouth
Living people